Bhavan's Vidya Mandir, Poochatty is a private co-educational school located in Poochatty, Thrissur, Kerala, India. It is a part of the Bharatiya Vidya Bhavan trust and is affiliated to the Central Board of Secondary Education, Delhi. The school offers classes from kindergarten to junior college. In addition to the main campus, it also has a satellite campus in the city.

Overview 
Bhavan's Vidya Mandir, Poochatty was established in the year 1979. The school was approved by the Central Board of Secondary Education on 7 October 1985. During the early days, the school functioned from leased buildings, moving to its present location on 10 December 1986.  The then president of India, Gyani Zail Singh, was chief guest for the inaugural function of the new campus. The school has an indoor sports complex, and individual hostels for both boys and girls with a combined strength of 200.

Principals 
 Ammini Brahmini Amma (1979–1984)
 Annapoorna Shastri   (1984–1986)
 P. Haridas Menon     (1987–1990)
 S. Rama Rathnam      (1990–1991)
 K. Krishnan          (1991–1992)
 E. P. Aravindakshan  (1992–1993)
 I. Vijayan           (1993–1996)
 V. Gopalan           (1996–2003)
 Shantha Muralidharan (2003–2007)
 Thomas K. Joseph     (2007–2010)
 Sujata Sivakrishnan  (2010–2014)
 V. Manoranjini       (2014–2017)

References

External links 
 

Schools in Thrissur
High schools and secondary schools in Kerala
Educational institutions established in 1979
Private schools in Kerala
Schools affiliated with the Bharatiya Vidya Bhavan
1979 establishments in Kerala